Shreya Guhathakurta (শ্রেয়া গুহঠাকুরতা) (3 February 1975) is an Indian Rabindra Sangeet singer.

Early life
Shreya Guhathakurta was born into a family of renowned musicians. Her orientation with music started at the age of four. She is the daughter of film and television actress, Saswati Guhathakurta and Bhishma Guhathakurta.
She lent her voice as a playback artist at the age of six for the film, "Deepar Prem", directed by late Arundhuti Devi. Shreya also acted in this film. Later at the age of 15, she lent her voice as a playback singer for the National Award-winning film ‘Antardhan’ directed by late Tapan Sinha.
Shreya is the granddaughter of late Suvo Guhathakurta, founder of two of the Rabindrasangeet institutions in Kolkata - Gitabitan & Dakshinee. She received formal training and diploma from Dakshinee, graduating in 1994. Shreya passed out with distinction and continued her learning process from her paternal uncle, Sudeb Guhatkurta.
From a very early age, Shreya also received ‘Talim’ from Late Kanika Bandyopadhyay who frequented their Kolkata residence. She considers "Mohor– dida" to be her biggest inspiration.
She is also the niece of recently deceased Rabindrasangeet exponent, Smt Ritu Guha.

Career
Shreya has performed all over the world. Her recent shows were held is Singapore, Canada, Bangladesh, U.K, Paris, Australia, Berlin and U.S.A.
Shreya is a regulars artist on popular T.V channels like ‘‘Tara Muzik’’ "Channel I" .

She has completed recording 12 songs for Bengal Foundation, Dhaka. Her album titled Baje Koruno Shure is slated for release in 2012.
Shreya has several CD's to her credit. Some of these are titled ‘Bimlo Anande’, ‘Shurer Doriyay’, released last year from Bangladesh. HMV Saregama has so far released 3 of her CD's  ‘Mon Bhulay Re’, ’Antabiheen Poth’, and ‘Anandadhara’, her new upcoming CD will be released in April this year titled ‘Khanchar Pakhi’. She has been listed in numerous Song Sites.

Shreya has recording over 800 songs for ‘Tara music’ and also recorded several songs for Gitabitan Archive released last year by "Saregama". 
Shreya has won critical acclaim for her performance in Tagore's dance dramas like Shyama, Chandalika. Chitrangada – with which she recently toured several cities in India like Delhi, Baroda, Hyderabad, Bangalore, Ranchi & Jamshedpur. Shreya Guhathakurta does online Rabindrasangeet workshops over Skype for Bengali students settled in London and Paris.

Awards
Shreya was recently awarded with the ’Shyamal Sen Smrriti Puroshkar’ for her outstanding contribution to the field of music and culture.
Shreya was awarded by Radio Big FM in Kolkata as the best singer in Rabindrasangeet category for the year 2011.

Musical style
She is notably one of the most popular Rabindrasangeet singers belonging to this generation. In particular, her musical style has often been compared with that of Kanika Bandyopadhyay. Shreya's rendition is melodious yet melancholy, plaintive yet soul-stirring as it was with Kanika Bandyopadhyay. One of the biggest reasons for her popularity is her ability to bridge the gap between classical old style ‘gharana’ and new age presentation.

References

1975 births
Bengali singers
Indian women playback singers
Singers from Kolkata
Rabindra Sangeet exponents
Living people
21st-century Indian women singers
21st-century Indian singers
Women musicians from West Bengal
20th-century women composers